"Don't Do Me Like That" is a song written by Tom Petty and recorded by Tom Petty and the Heartbreakers. It was released in November 1979 as the first single from the album Damn the Torpedoes (1979). It reached number 10 on the Billboard Hot 100, becoming the band's only Top 10 hit. The single also peaked at number 3 in Canada. In the UK, despite airplay by Capital Radio in the summer of 1980, the track failed to make the Top 75 chart.

Background
Petty wrote the song and recorded a demo version with his previous band Mudcrutch in 1974. At one point he strongly considered giving the song to The J. Geils Band because he thought it had their sound. During the Damn the Torpedoes sessions he was convinced by producer Jimmy Iovine to include it on the album because he sensed it would be a hit.

Reception
Billboard praised the song for its "strong lyrical hook backed up by some solid mid to fast rock instrumentation" and its "urgent" vocal.  Cash Box said that it "bounces along to a rock steady, engaging beat, bopping hook, staccato guitar chords with lively production." Record World called the hook "irresistible."

The Fort Worth Star Telegram rated it to be the 4th best single of 1979.

Single track listings
"Don't Do Me Like That" b/w "Casa Dega"Backstreet 41138 (US)
"Don't Do Me Like That" b/w "Century City""Something Else" (Live) b/w "Stories We Could Tell" (Live)Backstreet MCA 596 (UK 2x7" single)

Chart performance

Weekly charts

Year-end charts

References

1979 singles
1980 singles
American rhythm and blues songs
Tom Petty songs
Songs written by Tom Petty
Song recordings produced by Jimmy Iovine
1979 songs